The 6th Utah State Legislature was elected Tuesday, November 15, 1904, and convened on Monday, January 9, 1905.

Leadership

Utah Senate

 President of the Senate: Stephen H. Love

Utah House of Representatives

 Speaker of the House: Thomas Hull

Utah Senate

Members

Utah House of Representatives

Members

See also
 List of Utah state legislatures

References

Legislature

6
1900s in Utah
1905 in Utah
1906 in Utah
1905 U.S. legislative sessions
1906 U.S. legislative sessions